Magizhchi is a 2010 Indian Tamil-language film directed by V. Gowthaman. It stars Gowthaman himself in the lead role with Anjali, Karthika, director Seeman and Prakash Raj playing important supporting roles. The film, based on acclaimed writer Neela Padmanabhan's novel Thalaimuraigal, released on 19 November 2010, to favorable reviews.

Cast 

 V. Gowthaman as Thiravi
 Anjali as Kuzhali
 Karthika as Nagammai, Thiravi's sister
 Seeman as Kutralam
 Prakash Raj as Moses
 Sampath Raj as Sevatha Perumal
 Ganja Karuppu as Rasappan
 V. S. Raghavan as Thiravi's granduncle
 Sukumari as Thiravi's grandmother
 Anumol as Sasi
 Raju as Thiravi's father
 Pasanga Sivakumar as Kuzhali's father
 Azhagan Thamizhmani as Villager
 Manoj Kumar as Villager
 Veera Santhanam as Kannupillai, Sevatha Perumal's father
 Nellai Siva as Villager
 Sivanarayanamoorthy as Shop owner
 Krishnamoorthy as Rasappan's brother-in-law
 T. K. Kala as Kuttiammai, Thiravi's mother
 Supraja as Visalam, Thiravi's sister
 Premalatha as Rasappan's sister
 Madurai Saroja as Sevatha Perumal's mother
 Rangama Patti as Thiravi's grandaunt
 Risha in a special appearance

Soundtrack 

Vidyasagar has composed a total of 6 songs for the movie.

References

External links
 

2010 films
2010 drama films
2010s Tamil-language films
Films scored by Vidyasagar
Films based on Indian novels